Anbaran District is in Namin County, Ardabil province, Iran. At the 2006 census, its population was 10,593 in 2,614 households. The following census in 2011 counted 9,905 people in 2,900 households. At the latest census in 2016, the district had 9,804 inhabitants living in 3,010 households.

References 

Namin County

Districts of Ardabil Province

Populated places in Ardabil Province

Populated places in Namin County